Hollywood and the Stars is a 1963 NBC television documentary series produced by the  David L. Wolper Production Company in association with United Artists Television. It was narrated by Joseph Cotten with the theme music and several episodes composed by Elmer Bernstein. Jack Haley, Jr. was the series' producer for all its 31 episodes. He also wrote four episodes and directed 22 episodes. He also produced the hour-long pilot episode "The Great Stars" (narrated by Henry Fonda), originally syndicated in February 1963.

Each 30-minute show concentrated on a Hollywood genre, film or legendary star. This series ran from September 30, 1963 until May 18, 1964.

Episodes
Source:  
 The Man Called Bogart (9/30/1963)
 Sirens, Symbols & Glamour Girls (I) (10/7/1963)
 Sirens, Symbols & Glamour Girls (II) (10/14/1963) 
 They Went That-A- Way (10/21/1963)
 The Immortal Jolson (10/28/1963)
 How to Succeed as a Gangster (11/4/1963) 
 Birth of a Star (11/11/1963) 
 The Unsinkable Bette Davis (11/18/63)
 The Fabulous Musicals (12/2/1963) 
 The Funny Men (Part I) (12/9/1963) 
 The Funny Men (Part II) (12/16/1963) 
 The One and Only Bing (12/23/1963)
 Hollywood, USA (12/30/63)
 Monsters We've Known and Loved (1/6/64)
 Teenage Idols (Part I) (1/13/64)
 Teenage Idols (Part II) (1/20/64)
 Hollywood Goes To War (1/27/64)
 Anatomy of a Movie: The Cardinal (2/3/64)
 The Great Lovers (2/10/64)
 The Angry Screen (2/17/64)
 The Swashbucklers (2/24/64)
 On Location: The Night of the Iguana (3/2/64)  
 In Search of Kim Novak (3/9/64)
 Paul Newman:  Actor in a Hurry (3/16/64)
 Natalie Wood: Hollywood's Child (3/23/64)
 The Oscars: Moments of Greatness (Part I) (3/30/64)
 The Oscars: Moments of Greatness (Part II) (4/6/64)
 The Odyssey of Rita Hayworth (4/13/64)
 What a Way to Go!: An Extravaganza In The Making (4/20/64)
 The Great Directors (4/27/64)
 The Wild and Wonderful Thirties (5/4/64)

Notes

External links
 

1960s American documentary television series
1963 American television series debuts
1964 American television series endings
Black-and-white American television shows
NBC original programming
Television series by United Artists Television
American motion picture television series